Paquette is a surname. Notable people with the surname include:

 B. P. Paquette, Canadian film director, screenwriter, producer and academic
 Brad Paquette, American politician
 Cedric Paquette, Canadian hockey player
 Craig Paquette, American baseball player
 Gilbert Paquette, Canadian politician
 Karl Paquette, étoile at the Ballet de l'Opéra National de Paris 
 Leo Paquette, American chemist
 Pierre A. Paquette, Canadian politician
 Robert Paquette, Canadian singer-songwriter
 Robert L. Paquette, (born 1951), American historian
 Stéphane Paquette, Canadian singer-songwriter
 Yanick Paquette, American illustrator
 Renee Jane Paquette, an on-air personality with the WWE, otherwise known as Renee Young

Fictional characters
 Paquette, a character in Voltaire's novel Candide
Natalie "Wattson" Paquette, a character in Respawn Entertainment's Apex Legends.

See also
 Paquet

French-language surnames